Valentin Morozov (born June 1, 1975) is a Russian former professional ice hockey player who spent the majority of his career in the Russian Super League.

Playing career

NHL Draft
Valentin Morozov was drafted in the sixth round, 154th overall, by the Pittsburgh Penguins in the 1994 NHL Entry Draft. After being drafted, he remained in Russia and played four seasons with CSKA Moscov. After the 1996-97 season, Morozov left CSKA Moscow and signed with Krylia Sovetov.

AHL career
In the summer of 1998, Morozov would receive a training camp invite to skate with the Pittsburgh Penguins. Morozov was one of the final cuts of the Penguins training camp. On September 27, Morozov was assigned to the Penguins' AHL affiliate, the Syracuse Crunch. As a member of the Crunch, Morozov wore jersey #15. Despite finishing the season with 17 goals and 40 points in 63 games, Morozov also finished with a plus/minus of -40, which was the lowest mark among all Crunch players

Morozov was invited back to Pittsburgh Penguins training camp in the summer of 1999. After several weeks of training, Morozov was reassigned again to the Penguins' new AHL affiliate in Wilkes-Barre/Scranton. Morozov would change from his previous number 15 to 21. In 59 games with the W-B/S Penguins, Morozov scored 39 points, which was the fourth highest among Penguins forwards that season. After two seasons in North America, Morozov decided to return to Russia to continue his professional hockey career.

Russian Super League
Morozov returned to Russia for the 2000-01 season with Lada Togliatti, where he scored four points in nineteen games.

Russian Supreme League (Pervaya Liga)
In 2001-02, Morozov split time between the Russian Super League and the Pervaya Liga, a 2nd tier feeder league for the Russian Super League. He returned to the Central Red Army team. He played 18 games, scoring 4 goals and 4 assists. Morozov also played one game with Ufa Salavat Yulayev, also of the Russian Super League. While assigned to Pervaya Liga, Morozov split time between Severstal-2 Cherepovets and the Pervaya Liga's Central Red Army team.

Russian Major League (Vysshaya Liga)
Morozov spent the 2002-03 season with Khimik Voskresensk, a Vysshaya Liga team that was considered to be "Class-A 2nd division" to the Russian Super League. Morozov would have one of his best statistical seasons as a member of Khimik, scoring 20 points in 24 games.

Morozov would spend his final season splitting time between Krylia Sovetov's team in Vysshaya Liga and their team with Pervaya Liga.

Personal
Valentin Morozov is the oldest brother of Ak Bars Kazan forward Aleksey Morozov. Aleksey, like Valentin, was also drafted by the Pittsburgh Penguins; Valentin was drafted in the 6th round of the 1994 NHL Entry Draft, and Aleksey was drafted the following year (1st round, 24th overall) in the 1995 NHL Entry Draft.

Career statistics

References

External links

1975 births
HC CSKA Moscow players
HC Khimik Voskresensk players
Krylya Sovetov Moscow players
HC Lada Togliatti players
Living people
Ice hockey people from Moscow
Pittsburgh Penguins draft picks
Russian ice hockey right wingers
Salavat Yulaev Ufa players
Soviet Wings players
Syracuse Crunch players
Wilkes-Barre/Scranton Penguins players